Blair Athol distillery is a single malt whisky distillery in Scotland.  It is used in Bell's whisky, and is also normally available in a 12-year-old bottling. The distillery is located on the south edge of Pitlochry in Perthshire, near the River Tummel.

The distillery was founded in 1798 by John Steward and Robert Robertson, originally named 'Aldour', 
after the Allt Dour burn the distillery draws it water from, but closed soon after opening. The distillery opened again and changed ownership to John Robertson in 1825.

It was sold several times in the period after, going from John Robertson to Alexander 
Conacher & Co., then to John Conacher & Co, which was inherited by Elizabeth Conacher in 1860. It was sold again to Peter Fraser & Co, and again to Peter Mackenzie of P. McKenzie & Co Distillers Limited in 1882.

The distillery closed down in 1932. The mothballed distillery was bought by Arthur Bell and Sons, but didn't open again until it was rebuilt in 1949. In 1973 the distillery expanded, adding two further stills to the previous two.

References

External links
 Official website

Scottish malt whisky
Distilleries in Scotland
Companies based in Perth and Kinross
1798 establishments in Scotland
British companies established in 1798
Food and drink companies established in 1798
Buildings and structures in Pitlochry